is a former Japanese football player and manager.

Playing career
Nakamori was born in Yamato on July 10, 1974. After graduating from Takushoku University, he joined Japan Football League club Montedio Yamagata in 1997. The club was promoted to new league J2 League in 1999. In 2000, he moved to Japan Football League club Jatco TT. In 2002, he moved to Regional Leagues club Sagawa Printing. The club was promoted to JFL from 2003. In 2008, he played as playing manager and retired from playing career end of 2008 season.

Coaching career
In 2008, when Nakamori played for Japan Football League club Sagawa Printing, he became a playing manager. He managed the club until 2012.

Club statistics

References

External links

1974 births
Living people
Takushoku University alumni
People from Yamato, Kanagawa
Association football people from Kanagawa Prefecture
Japanese footballers
J2 League players
Japan Football League (1992–1998) players
Japan Football League players
Montedio Yamagata players
Jatco SC players
SP Kyoto FC players
Japanese football managers
Association football midfielders